"Scarlet" is a song by English rock band the Rolling Stones featuring guitarist Jimmy Page. The song was released through Polydor as a single from the reissue of the 1973 album Goats Head Soup on 22 July 2020.

Background and composition
"Scarlet" is written by Mick Jagger and Keith Richards, and produced by Jimmy Miller. It is described as "a raw, scratchy, loose limbed and actually rather sweet ditty with a cod reggae feel and lots [...] of guitars". The lyrics narrate "a girl named Scarlet who is doing [Jagger] wrong". It was recorded in October 1974. Jagger stated that the song originated in musician Ronnie Wood's home in Richmond, London during a studio session with Richards and guitarist Jimmy Page, while Richards recalled walking in during the end of rock band Led Zeppelin's session, after which their guitarist, Page, "decided to stay". It is thought to be titled after Page's daughter, Scarlet Page. When asked why it went unreleased for nearly 50 years, Jagger said that the song "wasn't really a Rolling Stones record".

Remixes
On 14 August 2020, the band released a remix by rock band The War on Drugs, which introduced "a pulsing new groove that kicks into double-time for the chorus". A second remix, featuring rock band The Killers and DJ Jacques Lu Cont was released on 28 August. It involved "a resonant, reverberating opening" and "layers of symphonic touches".

Music video
The music video stars Irish actor Paul Mescal, and was filmed at Claridge's Hotel in London with social distancing. It depicts Mescal in hotel rooms and empty bars, leaving the titular character desolate voice messages, drinking, dancing, and eventually collapsing in the lobby. The music video was directed by Chris Barrett and Luke Taylor, and released on 6 August 2020.

Personnel
Credits adapted from AllMusic.

The Rolling Stones
 Mick Jagger – vocals, guitar
 Keith Richards – guitar

Additional personnel
 Ian Stewart – piano
 Ric Grech – bass
 Howard Kilgour – engineering
 Jimmy Miller – production
 Jimmy Page – guitar
 Bruce Rowland – drums
 Rod Thear – engineering

Charts

References

External links

2020 singles
1974 songs
Polydor Records singles
The Rolling Stones songs
Song recordings produced by Jimmy Miller
Songs written by Jagger–Richards